In mathematics, the Rabinowitsch trick, introduced by George Yuri Rainich and published under his original name ,
is a short way of proving the general case of the Hilbert Nullstellensatz from an easier special case (the so-called weak Nullstellensatz), by introducing an extra variable.

The Rabinowitsch trick goes as follows. Let K be an algebraically closed field. Suppose the polynomial f in K[x1,...xn] vanishes whenever all polynomials f1,....,fm vanish. Then the polynomials f1,....,fm, 1 − x0f have no common zeros (where we have introduced a new variable x0), so by the weak Nullstellensatz for K[x0, ..., xn] they generate the unit ideal of K[x0 ,..., xn]. Spelt out, this means there are polynomials  such that
 
as an equality of elements of the polynomial ring . Since  are free variables, this equality continues to hold if expressions are substituted for some of the variables; in particular, it follows from substituting  that
 
as elements of the field of rational functions , the field of fractions of the polynomial ring . Moreover, the only expressions that occur in the denominators of the right hand side are f and powers of f, so rewriting that right hand side to have a common denominator results in an equality on the form
  
for some natural number r and polynomials . Hence
 
which literally states that  lies in the ideal generated by f1,....,fm. This is the full version of the Nullstellensatz for K[x1,...,xn].

References

Commutative algebra